DOT DOT DOT (also styled "..." or dotdotdot) is the pseudonym for an anonymous Norwegian visual, public and conceptual artist.

His work has been displayed in galleries around the world, and in cities such as Oslo, Copenhagen, Berlin, Paris, Málaga, Los Angeles, Miami, New York City, Tokyo, Bangkok and more. 
DOT DOT DOT's age and real name are not publicly known.

Biography 

DOT DOT DOT was born in Oslo, Norway. He first started as a graffiti artist in the late 90s. He operated under several different pseudonyms over the years. In 2000 he started creating stencil art, but continued creating conventional graffiti works.
DOT DOT DOT first gained notice for painting a rat in the town of Sandvika, outside Oslo.

DOT DOT DOT appeared on TV channel NRK talking about the street art movement together with Martin Berdahl Aamundsen from Kontur Forlag, before the release of the book Street Art Norway Vol. 2.

DOT DOT DOT participated at LandArt in October 2012, curated by Norwegian artists Mari Meen Halsøy and Kine Lillestrøm, in Romerike/Gjerdrum, just outside Oslo.
In October 2012 DOT DOT DOT together with ARD (All Rights Destroyed) started the ARD*POP-UP Festival in Oslo, inviting national and international artists to decorate walls throughout the city.

See also
 List of Norwegian artists
 Hyperrealism (visual arts)
 List of street artists
 List of pseudonyms

References

Further reading 
DOT DOT DOT (front cover), Omar Robert Hamilton (writer): Stadt der Rebellion  Berlin: Wagenbach Verlag (2018).
Martin Berdahl Aamundsen (editor), Øivin Horvei (editor): Street Art Norway Vol. 2  Oslo: Kontur forlag (2012).
Martin Berdahl Aamundsen (editor), Øivin Horvei (editor): Street Art Norway – Deluxe  Oslo: Kontur forlag (2010).

External links
 

Norwegian artists
20th-century Norwegian painters
21st-century Norwegian painters
Anonymous artists
Conceptual art
Political artists
Graffiti artists
Street artists
Public art
Living people
Year of birth missing (living people)
Pseudonymous artists